Lukis may refer to:

 Adrian Lukis, English actor 
 Francis William Fellowes Lukis, senior commander in the Royal Australian Air Force
 Frederick Lukis, Channel Islands archaeologist, naturalist, collector and antiquarian
 Mollie Lukis, Australian archivist and promoter of women's rights.
 Sir Charles Pardey Lukis (1857–1917), usually known as Sir Pardey Lukis, Director-General of the Indian Medical Service (1910–1917)
 Sami Lukis, Australian television and radio personality
 William Collings Lukis, British antiquarian, archeologist and polymath.

See also
 Luke (disambiguation)
 Lucas (disambiguation)

English-language surnames